Rhizomarasmius is a genus of fungi in the family Physalacriaceae, containing about five species.

General
The genus was created in 2000 by R. H. Petersen to accommodate two species then classified in Marasmius (M. pyrrhocephalus and M. undatus), but which do not belong there due to morphological grounds, including the nature of the cystidia and the way the mushrooms are rooted on a plant substrate.  This analysis was backed up in 2006 by DNA comparisons done by Wilson and Desjardin.

Unlike most Marasmius mushrooms, members of Rhizomarasmius grow on the rhizomes of ferns or flowering plants, and that is the signification of the genus name.  Instead of the Marasmiaceae this genus is placed in the Physalacriaceae, a sister clade but a separate family.

Species

See also
List of Agaricales genera

References

 
Agaricales genera
Physalacriaceae
Taxa named by Ron Petersen